The Autonomous University of Tlaxcala (in ) is a Mexican public university based in the state of Tlaxcala. It is currently ranked 35th among the best universities in the United Mexican States.

History 
The Autonomous University of Tlaxcala was founded on November 20, 1976. The Congress of the Free and Sovereign State of Tlaxcala, through Decree No. 95. The then President of the Republic, Luis Echeverría Álvarez attended on November 29, 1976, to lay the first stone of the university's rectory building.

Rectors 
 Luis Carvajal Espino (1976 - 1982)
 Moisés Barceinas Paredes (1982 - 1983)
 Héctor Israel Ortiz Ortiz (1983 - 1987)
 Héctor Vázquez Galicia (1988 - 1991)
 Juan Méndez Vázquez (1992 - 1995)
 Alfredo Vázquez Galicia (1996 - 1999)
 Héctor Israel Ortiz Ortiz (1999- 2000)
 Eugenio Romero Melgarejo (2000)
 René Grada Yautentzi (2000 -2004)
 Sandino Leonel Lelis Sánchez (2004 - 2005)
 Serafín Ortiz Ortiz (2005 - 2011)
 Víctor Job Paredes Cuahquentzi (2011 – 2014)
 Rubén Reyes Córdoba (2014 - 2018)
Luis Armando González Placencia (2018- a la fecha)

Identity

Emblem 
The coat of arms was designed in 1977 by architect Donaciano Blanco Flores, according to the historical background of the state of Tlaxcala.

 The traditional colors of the state of Tlaxcala are red and white, which were used by Xicohténcatl in his banners.
 The Heron is the symbol of Xicohténcatl and of the state of Tlaxcala itself.
 The two arms, which emerge from the heron, represent the unity and effort of the people of Tlaxcala, which emanate from a book that represents technique and knowledge.
 Above the heron and the two arms is the state of Tlaxcala and, below them, the motto of the university "Por la Cultura, a la Justicia Social" (For Culture, for Social Justice).
 The whole emblem is crowned by the name of the Institution.

Educational offer 

The Universidad Autónoma de Tlaxcala offers 42 bachelor's degrees, 2 specialties, 36 master's degrees and 11 doctorates.

Bachelor's Degrees  
Faculty of Agrobiology

Bachelor's Degree in Biology
Bachelor's Degree in Environmental Sciences
Bachelor's Degree in Veterinary Medicine and Animal Husbandry
Bachelor's Degree in Medical Naturopathy

Faculty of Basic Sciences, Engineering and Technology.
Bachelor's Degree in Computer Engineering
Bachelor's Degree in Electronic Systems Engineering
Bachelor's Degree in Mechanical Engineering
Bachelor's Degree in Chemical Engineering
Bachelor's Degree in Applied Mathematics 
Bachelor's Degree in Applied Mathematics
Bachelor's Degree in Industrial Chemistry

Faculty of Educational Sciences.
Bachelor's Degree in Educational Sciences
Bachelor's Degree in Educational Communication and Innovation

Faculty of Health Sciences 
Bachelor's degree in Nursing
Bachelor's Degree in Nursing
Bachelor's Degree in Nursing and Midwifery
Bachelor's Degree in Medical Surgery
Bachelor's Degree in Nutrition
Bachelor's Degree in Clinical Chemistry

Faculty of Economic and Administrative Sciences 
Bachelor's Degree in Administration
Bachelor's Degree in Administration
Bachelor's Degree in Public Accounting
Bachelor's Degree in International Business

Faculty of Sciences for Human Development 
Bachelor's Degree in Clinical Chemistry
Bachelor's Degree in Integral Care of the Elderly
Bachelor's Degree in Family Sciences
Bachelor's Degree in Special Education

Faculty of Law, Political Science and Criminology 
Degree in Political Science and Criminology
Bachelor's Degree in Political Science and Public Administration
Bachelor's Degree in Criminology
Bachelor's Degree in Law

Faculty of Design, Art and Architecture 
Bachelor of Arts in Architecture
Bachelor's Degree in Architecture
Bachelor's Degree in Visual Arts
Bachelor's Degree in Automotive Design
Bachelor's Degree in Textile Design

Faculty of Philosophy and Letters
Bachelor of Arts in Anthropology
Bachelor's Degree in Anthropology
Bachelor's Degree in Language Teaching
Bachelor's Degree in Philosophy
B.A. in History
Bachelor's Degree in Spanish Language and Literature
B.A. in Applied Modern Languages 
Bachelor's Degree in Applied Modern Languages
Bachelor's Degree in Hispanic American Literature

Faculty of Dentistry 
Bachelor's Degree in Dentistry
Bachelor's Degree in Dental Surgery

Faculty of Social Work, Sociology and Psychology.
Bachelor's Degree in Social Work
Bachelor's Degree in Sociology
Bachelor's Degree in Psychology
Bachelor's Degree in Psychotherapy

Unidad Académica Multidisciplinaria campus Calpulalpan 
Bachelor's Degree in Management
Bachelor's Degree in Administration
Bachelor's Degree in Educational Sciences
Bachelor's Degree in Political Science and Public Administration
Bachelor's Degree in Public Accountancy
Bachelor's Degree in Criminology
Bachelor's Degree in Law
Bachelor's Degree in Language Teaching 
Bachelor's Degree in Language Teaching
Bachelor's Degree in Computer Engineering 
Bachelor's Degree in Computer Engineering
Bachelor's Degree in Applied Modern Languages 
Bachelor's Degree in Applied Modern Languages
Bachelor's Degree in Psychology

Multidisciplinary Academic Unit Teacalco campus 
Bachelor's Degree in Environmental Sciences
Bachelor's Degree in Environmental Sciences
Bachelor's Degree in Political Science and Public Administration
Bachelor's Degree in Law
Bachelor's Degree in Psychology
Bachelor's Degree in Psychotherapy
Bachelor's Degree in Social Work

Specialties 

School of Dentistry
Specialty in Endodontics
Specialty in Pediatric Stomatology

Master's Degrees 

Centro de Investigación en Ciencias Administrativas
Master's Degree in Administration
Master's Degree in Tax Administration
Master's Degree in International Business

Research Center in Genetics and Environment 
Master's Degree in Environmental Sciences
Master's Degree in Environmental Sciences
Master's degree in Environmental Systems Science

Center for Interdisciplinary Research on Regional Development'
Master's Degree in Regional Analysis

Center for Legal-Political Research and Graduate Studies 
Master's Degree in Public Administration
Master's Degree in State and Municipal Public Administration
Master's Degree in Legal Argumentation
Master's Degree in Constitutional and Amparo Law
Master's Degree in Constitutional Law and Constitutional Procedure 
Master's Degree in Tax Law
Master's Degree in Tax Law
Master's Degree in Criminal Law

Tlaxcala Center for Behavioral Biology 
Master's Degree in Biological Sciences
Master's Degree in Biological Sciences

Faculty of Agrobiology 
Master's Degree in Animal Production
Master's Degree in Animal Production

Faculty of Basic Sciences, Engineering and Technology 
Master's Degree in Animal Production
Master's Degree in Quality Sciences
Master of Science in Chemical Engineering
Master of Science in Computational and Electronic Systems
Master of Science in Software Engineering
Master's Degree in Use and Management of Information and Communication Technologies.

Faculty of Education Sciences.
Master's Degree in Teaching, Research and Educational Innovation.
Master's Degree in Education

Faculty of Health Sciences 
Master's Degree in Health Sciences
Master's Degree in Public Health Sciences
Master's Degree in Nursing

Faculty of Sciences for Human Development 
Master's Degree in Special Education
Master's Degree in Special Education
Master's Degree in Family Therapy

School of Law, Political Science and Criminology 
Master's Degree in Constitutional Law
Master's Degree in Constitutional and Amparo Law
Master's Degree in Criminal Law

Facultad de Filosofía y Letras (Faculty of Philosophy and Letters)
Master's Degree in History
Master's Degree in Modern Languages and Discourse Studies

Faculty of Social Work, Sociology and Psychology 
Master's Degree in Social Sciences
Master's Degree in Social Sciences
Master's Degree in Social Work
Master's Degree in Gender Studies

Multidisciplinary Academic Unit 
Master's Degree in Education
Master's Degree in Education

Doctorate 

Biological Sciences Research Center
Ph.D. in Natural Sciences

Center for Interdisciplinary Research on Regional Development

Doctorate in Territorial Studies

Center for Research in Administrative Sciences 
Doctorate in Administrative Sciences
Doctorate in Administrative Sciences

Center for Research in Genetics and Environment
Doctorate in Environmental Science
Doctorate in Environmental Sciences

Center for Legal-Political Research and Graduate Studies 
Doctorate in Law and Environmental Sciences
Doctorate in Law

Tlaxcala Center for Behavioral Biology 
Doctorate in Biological Sciences
Doctorate in Biological Sciences

Facultad de Ciencias Básicas Ingeniería y Tecnología 
Doctorate in Basic Sciences, Engineering and Technology
Doctorate in Chemical Engineering Sciences.
Doctorate in Computer and Electronic Systems Sciences.

Faculty of Educational Sciences 
Doctorate in Education Sciences
Doctorate in Education

Faculty of Sciences for Human Development 
Doctorate in Special Education
Doctorate in Special Education
Doctorate in Family

Facilities 

The university is divided by areas according to its geographical location, both in the city of Tlaxcala de Xicohténcatl and in the rest of the state of Tlaxcala. The UATx is distributed throughout the following Tlaxcala municipalities:
 Tlaxcala de Xicohténcatl - Faculty of Dentistry and Faculty of Law, Political Sciences and Criminology, Faculty of Economic Administrative Sciences, Faculty of Sciences for Human Development and Faculty of Social Work, Sociology and Psychology.
 Ocotlán - Faculty of Educational Sciences and Faculty of Philosophy and Letters.
 Contla de Juan Cuamatzi - School of Design, Art and Architecture.
 Tlaxco - School of Agrobiology
 San Pablo del Monte - Unidad Académica Multidisciplinaria campus San Pablo del Monte]] - School of Design, Art and Architecture. 
 Huamantla - Veterinary Medicine and Zootechnics
 Zacatelco - Faculty of Health Sciences 
 Teacalco - Multidisciplinary Academic Unit Teacalco campus
 Apizaco - Faculty of Basic Sciences Engineering and Technology
 Ixtacuixtla - School of Agrobiology
 Calpulalpan - Unidad Académica Multidisciplinaria campus Calpulalpan]] - Unidad Académica Multidisciplinaria campus Calpulalpan

References

 Asociación Nacional de Universidades e Instituciones de Enseñanza Superior: ANUIES
 Oferta académica de la Universidad Autónoma de Tlaxcala
 Historia de la Universidad Autónoma de Tlaxcala

Autonomous University of Tlaxcala
Educational institutions established in 1959
1959 establishments in Mexico
Tlaxcala City